The seventeenth season of American Dad! aired on TBS from April 13, 2020, to December 21, 2020.


15th Anniversary 
Season 17 marked the series' 15th anniversary, and in celebration, TBS hosted a 15-episode marathon that ran from April 17, 2020 to April 24, 2020. Each episode handpicked by co-creator Matt Weitzman.

Episode list

Notes

References

2020 American television seasons
American Dad! (season 17) episodes